Talk To Me is a 2006 British documentary film directed by and starring Mark Craig.  The film won 'Best Short Doc' upon its debut at the Boulder International Film Festival in 2006.

Synopsis
The film follows Craig's relationships over a twenty-year period using answer phone tapes and photos of the time. The recordings were originally kept as 'a sort of diary' though this eventually developed into the film.

Release
The film screened in 2007 at the Ashland Independent Film Festival in Ashland, Oregon, and in June that year at the National Media Museum in Bradford, West Yorkshire, England,  It was previously available on More 4, 4od and DVD with some of the original soundtracks removed due to copyright reasons.  This version is available on archive.org.

Reception
The Daily Telegraph wrote that Mark Craig's use of onscreen photographs of his various callers from over a 20+ year period was a "brilliant collage" and "so inventive that it aspired to the condition of drama".  They lauded the film, writing "The cleverness of this work was that it gave a complete portrait not only of the callers, but also of Mark [the filmmaker]", and that it "conveyed a real sense of non-communication and of life's dramas."

Awards and nominations
 2006, won 'Best Short Doc' at Boulder International Film Festival
 2007, won 'Grierson Innovation award' at Sheffield International Documentary Festival 
 2007, won 'Special Mention' for 'Best Short Doc' at Hot Docs Canadian International Documentary Festival

References

External links
 
 Talk to Me at 4docs.org
 At the tone, please leave a message for posterity, 2007 Guardian article about the film

British documentary films
British independent films
Autobiographical documentary films
2006 films
2006 documentary films
2000s English-language films
2000s British films